Postomino (formerly ) is a village in Sławno County, West Pomeranian Voivodeship, in north-western Poland. It is the seat of the gmina (administrative district) called Gmina Postomino.

For the history of the region, see History of Pomerania.

The village has a population of 625.

References

Postomino